The Detroit Film Critics Society Award for Best Screenplay is an annual award given by the Detroit Film Critics Society to honor the best screenplays of that year. The awards was first given in 2011, at the body's fifth annual ceremony.

2010s

2020s 
Nomadland - Chloé Zhao (adapted)/Lee Isaac Chung, Minari (original)

References

Detroit Film Critics Society Awards
Lists of films by award
Awards established in 2011